Aneurin John Norman (born 22 March 1991) is a Welsh cricketer. Norman is a right-handed batsman who bowls right-arm medium pace. He was born in Cardiff, Glamorgan, and was educated at Millfield School in Somerset, England.

Norman made his debut in county cricket for Wales Minor Counties in the 2008 Minor Counties Championship against Dorset. To date he has made fifteen Minor Counties Championship appearances, as well as nine appearances in the MCCA Knockout Trophy.

Having played Second XI cricket for the Glamorgan Second XI since 2008, Norman made his full debut for Glamorgan in a List A match against the Unicorns in the 2011 Clydesdale Bank 40.  Later in the 2011 season, Norman made his first-class debut against Kent at the St Lawrence Ground in Canterbury, which was the first day/night County Championship match to be played in England. Norman was released by Glamorgan following the 2012 season, subsequently joining the Unicorns for the 2013 Yorkshire Bank 40.

References

External links
Aneurin Norman at ESPNcricinfo
Aneurin Norman at CricketArchive

1991 births
Living people
Cricketers from Cardiff
People educated at Millfield
Welsh cricketers
Wales National County cricketers
Glamorgan cricketers
Unicorns cricketers